I-53 or Japanese submarine I-53 may refer to more than one submarine:

 Japanese submarine I-53 (1925), an Imperial Japanese Navy Type KD3 submarine launched in 1925 and decommissioned in 1945, renumbered I-153 in 1942
 Japanese submarine I-53 (1942), an Imperial Japanese Navy Type C submarine launched in 1942 and decommissioned in 1945

Japanese Navy ship names
Imperial Japanese Navy ship names